Jennifer Zhang (張羽琪) is a Chinese-American woodwind musician. Crowned as the 2015 Miss Friendship Ambassador of Chicago,  she was granted the honor of representing Chicago in the 2015 Miss Chinese International Pageant in Hong Kong. In 2017, she won the Miss China International crown in Beijing.

Education 
Zhang graduated from the Northwestern University. She also attended the Berklee School of Music summer song-writing workshop and pursued non-degree studies from the Central Conservatory of Music in China.

Talent 
Zhang plays a variety of Chinese woodwind instruments such as the Chinese Transverse Bamboo Flute (Dizi), the Chinese Vertical Bamboo Flute (Xiao), the Chinese Bottle Gourd Silk (Hulusi), the Chinese Reed Flute (Bawu), as well as the Chinese Zither (Guzheng) and the piano.

Career 
Zhang is founder and president of Chicago-based Jeneration Capital investment firm. She was invited to New York for the Bloomberg Global Business Forum.
In 2013, Zhang becomes the brand ambassador for Louis Klein.

Music 
Zhang has created many original content including the following: 
 On The Throne
 Flying High
 Foam of The Ocean

Zhang was invited to perform her new songs at Chicago's American Got Talent.

Awards  

 Best Asian Entertainer by 2021 Chicago Music Awards  
 2020 Global Clean Environment Awards 
 2020 Brilliant Miss World 
 2017 Miss China International 
 2015 Miss Friendship Ambassador of Chicago,

References 

Year of birth missing (living people)
Living people
American woodwind musicians
American women classical pianists
American classical pianists
American actresses
People from Chicago
21st-century American women